The Hitra Tunnel is an undersea tunnel in Hitra Municipality in Trøndelag county, Norway. The tunnel connects the island of Hitra to the mainland.

The tunnel begins on the island of Jøsnøya, just south of the village of Sandstad. The tunnel then runs under the Trondheimsleia to the island of Hemnskjela. There is a small bridge connecting Hemnskjela to the mainland. The tunnel was built as part of a large project called "Fastlandsforbindelsen Hitra–Frøya". The project also included the construction of the Frøya Tunnel and the construction of a road and bridge network connecting the islands of Fjellværøy and Frøya.

The tunnel has three lanes. Nearly 2,500 cars pass through it every day.

Media gallery

References

Hitra
Road tunnels in Trøndelag
Subsea tunnels in Norway
1994 establishments in Norway
Tunnels completed in 1994